Eisenbergiella is a genus of bacteria from the family of Lachnospiraceae.

Etymology

Eisenbergiella, named in memory of the Polish physician and bacteriologist Dr Filip Eisenberg (1876-1942) who perished during the Holocaust.

References

Further reading 
 
 

Lachnospiraceae
Bacteria genera